Paliga anpingialis is a species of moth of the family Crambidae described by Embrik Strand in 1918. It is found in Taiwan.

References

Moths described in 1919
Pyraustinae